Expedition of Abu Ubaidah ibn al Jarrah, also known as the Expedition of Fish and Invasion of al-Khabt, took place in October 629 AD, 8AH, 7th month, of the Islamic Calendar, or according to some scholars in 7AH, 4th Month.

Expedition
In the next month, Muhammad sent Abu Ubaidah ibn al Jarrah  along with 300 men to attack and chastise the tribe of Juhaynah at al-Khabat, on the seacoast, five nights journey from Medina. He was sent to observe a Quraysh caravan. There was no fighting as the enemy fled after they heard of the arrival.

This expedition is famous because Muslims were short of supply and food was running out, and they were fighting for survival, they suffered from famine, in the end, the Muslims caught a large fish (sperm whale) that came ashore and ate it for twenty days.Ibn Hisham mention the incident in large detail. This is why it is also known as ‘expedition of fish.’ They brought some of that meat to prophet Muhammad and he ate it too.

Islamic Primary sources

The Expedition is referenced in the Sunni hadith collection Sahih al-Bukhari as follows:

The Event is also referenced in the Sahih Muslim hadith collection as follows:

See also
Military career of Muhammad
List of expeditions of Muhammad

Notes

629
Campaigns ordered by Muhammad